Mankivka Raion was a raion (district) of Cherkasy Oblast, central Ukraine. Its administrative centre was located at the urban-type settlement of Mankivka. The raion was abolished on 18 July 2020 as part of the administrative reform of Ukraine, which reduced the number of raions of Cherkasy Oblast to four. The area of Mankivka Raion was merged into Uman Raion. The last estimate of the raion population was 

At the time of disestablishment, the raion consisted of three hromadas:
 Buky settlement hromada with the administration in the urban-type settlement of Buky;
 Ivanky rural hromada with the administration in the selo of Ivanky;
 Mankivka settlement hromada with the administration in Mankivka.

References

Former raions of Cherkasy Oblast
1923 establishments in Ukraine
Ukrainian raions abolished during the 2020 administrative reform